is a Japanese sports shooter. He competed in the men's 50 metre rifle three positions event at the 1976 Summer Olympics.

References

1953 births
Living people
Japanese male sport shooters
ISSF rifle shooters
Olympic shooters of Japan
Shooters at the 1976 Summer Olympics
Shooters at the 1974 Asian Games
Asian Games medalists in shooting
Asian Games bronze medalists for Japan
Medalists at the 1974 Asian Games
20th-century Japanese people